Nkasi District (formerly Nkansi District) is one of the three districts of the Rukwa Region of Tanzania, with its headquarters in the village of Namanyere.  It is bordered to the north by the Mpanda District of Katavi Region; to the east by the Sumbawanga District; to the south by the Sumbawanga Rural District and Zambia; and to the west by Lake Tanganyika across from the Democratic Republic of Congo.

, the population of the Nkasi District was 208,497.

History
Nkasi District was established on 1 January 1984.

Economy
Nkasi District is almost entirely rural, with well over 90% of its population undertaking subsistence farming, livestock rearing, and traditional fishing. Thirty-three of the villages in the district are located beside Lake Tanganyika. Major crops include: maize, millet, beans, and cassava. Commercial fishing in Lake Tanganyika is limited due to lack of storage facilities as well as capital to acquire fishing gear.

Administrative subdivisions
, Nkasi District was administratively divided into thirteen wards. After the 2012 reorganization it had seventeen wards.

2002 wards

 Chala
 Isale
 Kabwe
 Kala
 Kate
 Kipande
 Kirando
 Mkwamba
 Mtenga
 Namanyere
 Ninde
 Sintali
 Wampembe

2012 wards

 Chala
 Isale
 Kabwe
 Kala
 Kate
 Kipande
 Kipili
 Kirando
 Korongwe
 Mkwamba
 Mtenga
 Namanyere
 Ninde
 Nkandasi
 Nkomolo
 Sintali
 Wampembe

Notes

Districts of Rukwa Region